A backlash is a strong adverse reaction to an idea, action, or object.  It is usually a reflection of a normative resentment rather than a denial of its existence. In Western identitarian political discourse, the term is commonly applied to instances of bias and discrimination against marginalized groups. In this form of discourse, backlash can be explained as the response- or counter reaction- to efforts of social progress made by a group to gain access to rights.

Historical Western examples 
 13th Amendment — Jim Crow Laws were racial backlash in response to the amendment to the United States constitution.
 Civil rights — Voting restrictions implemented.
 Women's Movement — Backlash centered on infertility issues, women's "biological clock" and shortage of men.

Contemporary Western examples 
 Me Too Movement — Impacted women in the workforce. Men were more reluctant to hire women deemed attractive, more reluctant to have one-on-one meetings with women, and had greater fears of being unfairly accused. In addition to this, 56% of women surveyed predicted that men would continue to harass them but would be more cautious to avoid being caught. Backlash of date-rape prevalent with misleading language used in media. In 1987 it was called an "epidemic" and in 1993, "rape hype"; terms that were exaggerated and victim oriented.
 Abortion — Defund Planned Parenthood Act 
 "This bill temporarily restricts federal funding for Planned Parenthood Federation of America, Inc. Specifically, the bill prohibits, for a one-year period, the availability of federal funds for any purpose to this entity, or any of its affiliates or clinics, unless they certify that the affiliates and clinics will not perform, and will not provide any funds to any other entity that performs, an abortion during such period. This restriction does not apply in cases of rape or incest or where a physical condition endangers a woman's life unless an abortion is performed.
 Racial backlash — Former President Donald Trump wins the 2016 U.S. presidential election running a right-wing populist campaign that heavily utilized dog whistle rhetoric and other coded appeals to "white anxiety" over growing multiculturalism in the United States; Trump previously promulgated the "Birther" conspiracy theory that claimed the presidency of his predecessor, Barack Obama, was not legitimate by falsely asserting Obama was not born in the United States. 
 Transgender rights — Bathroom bills and medical bans are proposed to restrict the rights of transgender youth and adults. Arguments center around fair play in sports and sexual harassment in bathrooms. 
 Black Lives Matter — Blue Lives Matter and All Lives Matter campaigns created in response.
 Bikelash - A colloquial term about the social and political resistance to the creation of urban infrastructure intended to accommodate safer cycling, seemingly at the expense of the use of automobiles.

Literature 

 Backlash: The Undeclared War Against American Women, a book by Susan Faludi
 "An accurate charting of American women's progress through history might look more like a corkscrew tilted slightly to one side, its loops inching closer to the line of freedom with the passage of time-but, like a mathematical curve approaching infinity, never touching its goal."

See also
EDSA III
Estallido social
Feminazi
Straight pride
White backlash
White Lives Matter
Yellow vests movement
Angry young man (South Korea)

References

Further reading 
 
 
 
 
 
 
 
 
 
 
 
 
 

Reactionary
Right-wing populism